Edwin Darlington Ricketts (August 3, 1867 – July 3, 1937) was an American lawyer and politician who served as a U.S. Representative from Ohio for three terms in the early 20th century.

Biography 
Born near Maxville, Ohio, Ricketts attended the public schools.
For twelve years, he was a teacher and superintendent of schools.
He then studied law and was admitted to the bar in 1899 and commenced practice in Logan, Ohio.

Congress 
Ricketts was elected as a Republican to the Sixty-fourth Congress (March 4, 1915 – March 3, 1917).
He was an unsuccessful candidate for reelection in 1916 to the Sixty-fifth Congress.

Ricketts was elected to the Sixty-sixth and Sixty-seventh Congresses (March 4, 1919 – March 3, 1923).
He was an unsuccessful candidate for reelection in 1922 to the Sixty-eighth Congress.

Later career and death 
He then resumed the practice of law and served as delegate to the Republican National Convention in 1928. 

Ricketts died in Logan, Ohio, on July 3, 1937, and was interred in Oak Grove Cemetery.

Sources

1867 births
1937 deaths
People from Logan, Ohio
Ohio lawyers
People from Perry County, Ohio
Republican Party members of the United States House of Representatives from Ohio